Dave Keane (born 1956 in Passage West, County Cork, Ireland) is an Irish retired hurling manager and former player.  He played hurling with his local clubs Passage West and Adare and was manager of the Limerick senior inter-county team from 2002 until 2003.

He managed Limerick to 3 All-Ireland Under 21 Hurling Championships from 2000-02.

References

1956 births
Living people
Passage West hurlers
Adare hurlers
Hurling managers